Ludwig is a 1973 epic biographical drama film about Ludwig II, who ruled Bavaria from 1864 to 1886. Directed and co-written by Luchino Visconti, the film stars Helmut Berger as Ludwig and Romy Schneider as Empress Elisabeth of Austria (reprising the role from the unrelated 1955 film Sissi and its two sequels), along with Trevor Howard, Silvana Mangano, Helmut Griem, and Gert Fröbe. It is the third and final part of Visconti's "German Trilogy" - preceded by The Damned (which also starred Berger and Griem) and Death in Venice.

An international co-production (shot in English) by Italian producer Ugo Santalucia and West German producer Dieter Giessler, Ludwig was one of the most expensive European films at the time, and was a moderate success in its home territories, but was more lukewarmly received in the United States, where a heavily truncated 177 minute version was released. It was filmed in Munich and surrounding parts of Bavaria, and at Cinecittà Studios. As indicated in its closing credits, the film had the distinction of featuring a performance by Franco Mannino of the previously unpublished original piano composition by Richard Wagner, his Elegie in A Flat Major, regarded as his final work for piano.

Ludwig won two David di Donatello Awards, for Best Film and Best Director, and was nominated for an Academy Award for Best Costume Design. Helmut Berger and Romy Schneider both received German Film Award nominations for their acting, and Berger won a "Special David di Donatello" for his portrayal of the King.

Plot 
Munich, 1864. The 18-year-old, idealistic Ludwig II is crowned as the King of Bavaria. His first official act is a lavish support for the inspired but indebted composer Richard Wagner, who settles in Munich after Ludwig's request. Ludwig's cabinet cannot understand his support for the arts and is furious about Wagner's expensive lifestyle. Ludwig tries to find a faithful friend in Wagner, whose music he loves, but these hopes get shattered: behind the King's back, Wagner has an affair with Cosima von Bülow, the wife of Wagner's opportunistic conductor Hans von Bülow. In order to avoid a scandal, Wagner has to leave Munich. Ludwig continues to support Wagner and his projects, but he still mistrusts him.

Another important person for Ludwig is Empress Elisabeth of Austria, his independent and charismatic cousin. During a meeting with other aristocratic families in Bad Ischl, Elisabeth and Ludwig get close to each other and they share a kiss. However, Elisabeth is more interested in bringing up a marriage between her beautiful, cultivated sister Sophie and Ludwig, but the king ignores Sophie. Disappointed by Wagner and Elisabeth, Ludwig starts to withdraw from public into dream worlds. Ludwig wants Bavaria to stay neutral in the Austro-Prussian War 1866, but his cabinet has another opinion and they eventually support the Austrian's loser's side. Ludwig ignores the war and stays in his castle, much to the irritation of his younger brother Otto and his close confidant Count Dürckheim. Dürckheim advises him to a marriage in order to prevent loneliness.

Shortly after Ludwig becomes aware of his homosexuality, he suddenly announces his engagement with Sophie in January 1867. His mother and the cabinet send an actress into his apartments, who is instructed to give him sexual experience. Ludwig feels angry about the actress and throws her into his bathtub. Ludwig has doubts if he can be a good husband to Sophie who loves him, and he postpones and eventually cancels the marriage. Instead, he starts having relationships with his servants, although the devout Catholic feels guilt about his homosexuality. Bavaria supports the Prussian army in the Franco-Prussian War of 1871, but during the following Unification of Germany, he loses much of his sovereignty to the Prussian emperor Wilhelm I and Chancellor Otto von Bismarck. Shortly after the Franco-Prussian War, the mental health of Ludwig's younger brother Otto declines and doctors have to take care of him. Ludwig is shocked by his brother's illness.

Ludwig does not care about politics anymore, instead, he spends his money building Neuschwanstein Castle, Linderhof Palace and Herrenchiemsee. The cabinet feels increasingly frustrated by the eccentric and secluded king's debts. In 1881, the king has a short but fierce friendship with actor Josef Kainz, whose Romeo performance he adores, but Kainz is mostly interested in the king's money. Ludwig also hosts some orgies with his servants. When his cousin Elisabeth wants to visit him after a long time, he refuses to see her.

In 1886, the psychiatrist Bernhard von Gudden declares that Ludwig is insane, following the advice of his scheming Cabinet. With the help of his faithful servants, Ludwig can arrest his cabinet for a few hours. His friends advise him to fight against the accusation that he is insane, but he only feels world-weary and depressed. Eventually, his uncle Luitpold is declared Prince Regent of Bavaria. Ludwig is brought to Berg Castle near Lake Starnberg, where he has to stay under arrest and gets psychological treatment. Two days later, Ludwig and Von Gudden leave the castle for a walk. A few hours later, their corpses are found in the Lake Starnber, dead by unknown causes.

Cast

Production 
Ludwig was filmed at Cinecitta Studios in Rome, and on-location in Bavaria, West Germany. Filming taking place at Roseninsel, Berg Castle, Lake Starnberg, Castle Herrenchiemsee, Castle Hohenschwangau, Linderhof Palace, Cuvilliés Theatre, Nymphenburg Palace, Ettal, Kaiservilla and Neuschwanstein Castle. Shooting began in late January 1972 and lasted six months.

Luchino Visconti, who was a descendent of the Ludwig through Margarete von Bayern and Federico I Gonzaga, was fascinated by the story of the loner and esthete monarch and saw him as "the last absolutist ruler who preferred to rule with art rather than politics".

Much like The Damned and Death in Venice, Visconti shot Ludwig in English to account for the different nationalities in the cast (a mix of German, English, and Italian speakers). Scenes were shot silent (MOS) and then the actors looped their lines in post-production. While most of the German-speaking cast dubbed their own lines for the German release, Helmut Berger was replaced by a different actor due to his Austrian accent. In the Italian version, he was dubbed by Giancarlo Giannini.

During the last stages of production, on July 27, 1972, Visconti suffered a stroke. In the documentary The Life and Times of Count Luchino Visconti, screenwriter Enrico Medioli claimed the illness was caused by the sudden transition from the cold of the Austrian countryside to the heat of the Cinecittà soundstages.

Music 
Rather than an original score, the film uses pre-existing orchestral pieces by Richard Wagner (excerpts from Lohengrin, Tristan und Isolde, and Tannhäuser), Jacques Offenbach, and Robert Schumann. The film had the distinction of featuring a performance by Franco Mannino of the previously unpublished original piano composition by Wagner, Elegie in A Flat Major, regarded as his final work for piano.

Reception

Critical response

Awards and nominations

Censorship and alternate versions 
The director's cut by Visconti was over four hours long, which the film's distributors deemed as too long. Ludwig was then shortened to three hours at the premiere in Bonn on 18 January 1973. The cutback was without Visconti's consent, but the director, who was in bad health after a stroke during filming, was not able to stop it. The depiction of Ludwig's homosexuality caused a controversy, particularly in Bavaria, where King Ludwig was admired by many Conservatives. Among the critics was Bavarian prime minister Franz Josef Strauss, who was also at the film's premiere. The distributors feared controversy and a further 55 minutes were cut from the premiere version, reducing the film to two hours. Scenes with homosexual hints and some of the more philosophical dialogues in the film were cut in order to make the film more popular with mainstream audiences.

There are at least four different versions of the film, which according to the All Movie Guide "suffers greatly when shortened, as every moment is essential to the story". German film critic Wolfram Schütte wrote that those who saw the shortened version "haven't seen the film". The film was restored to its four-hour length by Ludwig-film editor Ruggero Mastroianni and Ludwig-screenwriter Suso Cecchi d'Amico in 1980, four years after Visconti's death, and had its premiere at the Venice Film Festival.

In April 2017, Arrow Video released a blu-ray/DVD "limited edition" restoration, including both the full-length theatrical edition at 238 minutes, and a five-part "television version" of the film. The blu-ray edition was restored in 2K resolution from the original 35mm camera negative. Elements that had been censored from some earlier releases, such as allusions to Ludwig's homoerotic longing and occasional glimpses of male nudity, are included in Arrow's home video restoration. In addition to the Italian language soundtrack, the Arrow release optionally includes the film's English audio for the first time on home video. The soundtrack was originally created for the 173-minute U.S. version and, as such, portions of the full-length presentation intermittently revert to the Italian dialogue to the extent an English version was either not recorded or not preserved. It appears that some of the principal actors, including Helmut Berger in the lead role, spoke English during the shoot. The limited edition disk set also included a booklet insert about the film and a number of featurettes about the film and its creative team.

References

Further reading

External links 
 

1973 films
1973 LGBT-related films
1970s biographical films
1970s historical films
French biographical drama films
West German films
English-language French films
English-language German films
English-language Italian films
1970s French-language films
1970s Italian-language films
German biographical drama films
German epic films
German historical drama films
German LGBT-related films
Italian biographical drama films
Italian epic films
Italian historical drama films
Italian LGBT-related films
Gay-related films
Biographical films about German royalty
Films about classical music and musicians
Films set in Bavaria
Films set in the Kingdom of Bavaria
Films set in castles
Films set in the 1860s
Films set in the 1870s
Films set in the 1880s
Cultural depictions of Ludwig II of Bavaria
Cultural depictions of Richard Wagner
Films with screenplays by Suso Cecchi d'Amico
Films directed by Luchino Visconti
Metro-Goldwyn-Mayer films
1970s English-language films
1970s Italian films
1970s German films
French historical drama films
French LGBT-related films
French epic films